State Route 178 (SR 178) is a  route in Clarke County in the southwestern part of the state. The western terminus of the route is at its junction with US 43 north of Grove Hill. The route ends at the city center of Fulton.

Route description
SR 178 is a  spur of US 43.  Traveling east from US 43, the route travels along a two-lane road, connecting the small town of Fulton to the U.S. highway.

Major intersections

References

External links

178
Transportation in Clarke County, Alabama